The Shipibo-Conibo are an indigenous people along the Ucayali River in the Amazon rainforest in Peru. Formerly two groups, the Shipibo and the Conibo, they eventually became one distinct tribe through intermarriage and communal ritual and are currently known as the Shipibo-Conibo people.

Lifestyle, tradition and diet
The Shipibo-Conibo live in the 21st century while keeping one foot in the past, spanning millennia in the Amazonian rainforest. Many of their traditions are still practiced, such as ayahuasca medicine work. Medicine songs have inspired artistic tradition and decorative designs found in their clothing, pottery, tools and textiles. Some of the urbanized people live around Pucallpa in the Yarina Cocha, an extensive indigenous zone. Most others live in scattered villages over a large area of jungle forest extending from Brazil to Ecuador.

Shipibo-Conibo women make beadwork and textiles, and are well-known for their pottery, decorated with maze-like red and black geometric patterns. While these ceramics were traditionally made for use in the home, an expanding tourist market has provided many households with extra income through the sale of pots and other craft items. They also prepare chapo, a sweet plantain beverage.

The Shipibo of the village of Pao-Yan used to have a diet of fish, yuca and fruits. Recently, however, the situation has deteriorated because of global weather changes and now there is mostly just yuca and fish. Since there has been drought followed by flooding, most of the mature fruit trees have died, and some of the banana trees and plantains are struggling. Global increases in energy and food prices have risen due to deforestation and erosion along the Ucayali River. The basic needs of the people are more important now than ever, affecting their long-term planning abilities. There is now a sense that hunger may not be that far off for those in the farther reaches of the Shipibo nation.

Contact with western sources – including the governments of Peru and Brazil – has been sporadic over the past three centuries.  The Shipibo are noted for a rich and complex cosmology, which is tied directly to the art and artifacts they produce. Christian missionaries have worked to convert them since the late 17th century, particularly the Franciscans.

Population

With an estimated population of over 20,000, the Shipibo-Conibo represent approximately 8% of the indigenous registered population. Census data is unreliable due to the transitory nature of the group.  Large amounts of the population have relocated to urban areas –  in particular the eastern Peruvian cities of Pucallpa and Yarinacocha – to gain access to better educational and health services, as well as to look for alternative sources of monetary income.

The population numbers for this group have fluctuated in the last decades between approximately 11,000 (Wise and Ribeiro, 1978) to as many as 25,000 individuals (Hern 1994).

Like all other indigenous populations in the Amazon basin, the Shipibo-Conibo are threatened by severe pressure from outside influences such as oil speculation, logging, narco-trafficking, and conservation.

See also

 Curandero
 Guillermo Arévalo
 Pablo Amaringo
 Shipibo language

References

Further reading

External links

 Shipibo Conibo Center of New York, NY, USA
 Shipibo art and Conibo art at the National Museum of the American Indian, USA
 Ana Jost is a fashion designer with Shipibo roots.

Ethnic groups in Peru
Indigenous peoples in Peru
Indigenous peoples of the Amazon